The Defence Service Medal with Laurel Branch is a military medal of Norway.  Established on 1 May 1982, the medal is awarded for outstanding or noteworthy service to the Norwegian Armed Forces. It may be awarded to Norwegians and foreigners who are civilians or military personnel.

Appearance
The Defense Service Medal with Laurel Branch is a round embossed medal made of silver metal. The obverse bears the depiction of three swords placed side by side with the blades pointing upwards. The reverse bears the inscription FORSVARET – FOR FORTJENESTER (ARMED FORCES – FOR MERIT) The medal is suspended from a red ribbon with a central vertical stripe of silver. A laurel branch device is attached to the suspension ribbon of the medal, and the service ribbon worn in undress.

References

Military awards and decorations of Norway
Awards established in 1982
1982 establishments in Norway